Makhmut Akhmetovich Gareyev (23 June 1923 – 25 December 2019) was a Russian General of the Army and an author of several books on the history of the Second World War. He served as Deputy Chief of the General Staff of the Armed Forces of the USSR. Until his death, he was the president of the Russian Academy of Military Sciences.

A decorated veteran of the Second World War, he had a lifelong career in the Soviet military starting from the Junior Lieutenant in the beginning of the war and reaching general rank in the 1970s.

His positions also included serving as the military adviser to the President of Egypt in the 1970s and to President Najibullah of the Democratic Republic of Afghanistan in 1989–1991.

Gareev served as an editor-in-chief and authored a few books himself.

In September 2015, Chinese President Xi Jinping awarded Gareev the Medal of Honor for his contribution in the 1945 battle to liberate Mudanjiang in Northeast China from the Empire of Japan.

Early life

Gareev was born in Chelyabinsk, the child of ethnic Tatars originally from the Chimshin region of Bashkiria. His father Akhmat Gareev was an industrial worker and his mother, Rahema was a housewife. The family also lived in Central Asia.

Gareev joined the Red Army in 1939 as a volunteer and graduated from the Tashkent Infantry School in 1941. He was initially posted to an infantry unit in the Turkestan Military District.

World War II

Gareev was transferred to the Western Front in November 1942 and fought as an infantry officer in the Battle of Rzhev where he was wounded. Gareev was subsequently promoted to a deputy commander of an infantry battalion and a staff officer of the 45th Rifle Corps. Gareev was wounded in the head in 1944 in Belorussia.

Upon recovering from his wound he was posted to the Far East in January 1945 joining the staff of the 5th Army. He fought in the Soviet–Japanese War (August Storm) and finished the war as a Major.

Post War service

Gareev continued on the staff of the 5th Army in the Far East after the war and then graduated from the M. V. Frunze Military Academy in 1950. During 1950-1957, he was the chief of staff of the regiment, senior officer of the operational command of the headquarters of the Belorussian Military District, commander of the 307th Guards Motor Rifle Training Regiment in the 45th Tank Training Division of the Belorussian Military District, chief of staff of the 120th Guards Motor Rifle Division.

In 1959 Gareev graduated from the Military Academy of the General Staff. He became a Deputy Division Commander in 1959. Since February 1965 he was commander of the 50th Guards Motor Rifle Division in the 28th Combined Arms Army of the Belorussian Military District. Since June 1966, he commanded a tank division. From July 1968 to September 1970 he was Chief of Staff and then First Deputy Commander of the 28th Combined Arms Army.

In 1970-71 he was a military adviser to the United Arab Republic. He became commander of the Urals Military District in 1971. From February 1974, he was head of the Military Scientific Directorate of the General Staff, deputy chief of the Main Operational Directorate of the General Staff, and in 1984 was deputy chief of the General Staff of the Armed Forces of the USSR. Gareev was promoted to Colonel General in October 1978.

In 1989, he was the Chief Military Adviser in Afghanistan after the withdrawal of a limited contingent of Soviet troops from there. He played a large role in planning the military operations of government forces of President Mohammad Najibullah. Gareev was promoted to the rank of General of the Army in 1990.

From 1990, he served as Military Adviser - Inspector of the Group of Inspectors General of the USSR Ministry of Defence. Gareev retired from active service in 1992

Family

Gareev married Tamara Ivanovna after the war, his wife was of Belorussian origin and died in 1998. They had two children: Timur (born 1961) a retired Major General in the Russian army and Galia (born 1952) who is a retired English language teacher.

Military Science and Theory

Gareev began to actively engage in military scientific work back in the 1960s and 1970s. Author of over 100 scientific papers, over 300 articles and publications in collections, magazine and newspapers. He was the lead author of numerous Soviet Army manuals.

In February 1995 he was elected as the first president of Academy of Military Sciences, a non-governmental research organisation. Gareev was engaged in the study of the history of the Great Patriotic War, was actively involved in scientific discussions, and opposed the falsification of the history of the war. He believed that the desire to challenge the victory of the USSR over fascism is closely connected with the propaganda campaign against modern Russia. He was the author of numerous historical works.

In addition, he was an inspector general with the Office of Inspectors General of the Ministry of Defence of the Russian Federation, Deputy Chairman of the Public Council under the Ministry of Defence of the Russian Federation, Deputy Chairman of the Public Council under the Chairman of the Military Industrial Commission under the Government of the Russian Federation.

Gareev died on 25 December 2019 at the age of 96 and was buried at the Federal Military Memorial Cemetery.

Partial bibliography
 General Gareev, If War Comes Tomorrow?: The Contours of Future Armed Conflict (Cass Series on Soviet Military Theory and Practice) (Paperback), Routledge, 1998, 
 Makhmut Akhmetovich Gareev, M.V. Frunze, Military Theorist (Hardcover), Macmillan, 1988, 
 M. A. Gareev, Marshal Zhukov: Velichie i unikalnost polkovodcheskogo iskusstva, Vostochnyi universitet, 1996, 
 M. A. Gareev, Neodnoznachnye stranitsy voiny: Ocherki o problemnykh voprosakh istorii Velikoi Otechestvennoi voiny, RFM, 1995, 
 M. A. Gareev, Konturen des bewaffneten Kampfes der Zukunft: Ein Ausblick auf das Militarwesen in den nachsten 10 bis 15 Jahren (Schriftenreihe des Bundesinstituts fur ... und Internationale Studien, Koln), Nomos; 1. Aufl edition (1996), 
 M. A. Gareev, Moia posledniaia voina: Afganistan bez sovetskikh voisk, INSAN, 1996,

References

 Bio

1923 births
2019 deaths
Volga Tatar people
People of the Soviet–Afghan War
Frunze Military Academy alumni
Russian generals
20th-century Russian historians
Russian Sunni Muslims
Army generals (Soviet Union)
Soviet military personnel of World War II
Tatar people of Russia
Recipients of the Order "For Service to the Homeland in the Armed Forces of the USSR", 2nd class
Recipients of the Order "For Merit to the Fatherland", 3rd class
Recipients of the Order of Alexander Nevsky
Recipients of the Order of Lenin
Recipients of the Order of the Red Banner
Recipients of the Order of the Red Banner of Labour
Burials at the Federal Military Memorial Cemetery
Military Academy of the General Staff of the Armed Forces of the Soviet Union alumni